This is a list of foreign players in the Premier Hockey League, which commenced play in 2005. The following players must meet the following criteria:
Have played at least one League game. Players who were signed by Premier League clubs.

Argentina 
Jorge Lombi – Hyderabad Sultans – 2006
Mario Almada – Orissa Steelers – 2007

Australia 
Paul Blake – Bangalore Hi-fliers – 2007
Lloyd Scott – Chandigarh Dynamos – 2007
Jamie Dwyer – Maratha Warriors – 2007
Albert Casas – Chennai Veerans – 2007
Brent Livermore – Maratha Warriors – 2007

Malaysia 
Kuhan Shanmugunathan – Bangalore Hi-fliers- 2005, Chennai Veerans – 2007
Azlan Bakar – Sher-e-Jalandhar- 2005

Netherlands 
Sebastian Westerhout – Hyderabad Sultans – 2007
Oscar ter Weeme – Hyderabad Sultans – 2008
Thijs de Greeff – Bangalore Hi-fliers – 2007  
Sander Van Der Weide – Bangalore Hi-fliers – 2007  
Olivier Rutgers – Bangalore Hi-fliers – 2008  
Sebastian Westerhout – Bangalore Hi-fliers – 2008
Lodewijk de Bruijn – Maratha Warriors – 2006
Balder Bomans – Chandigarh Dynamos – 2006
Timo Bruinsma – Chandigarh Dynamos – 2007
Tjeerd Steller – Orissa Steelers – 2007
Don Prins – Sher-e-Jalandhar – 2008 
Melchior Looijen – Maratha Warriors – 2008
Huib Zwerver – Chandigarh Dynamos – 2008
Cesco Van Der Vliet – Chennai Veerans – 2008 
Eric-Jan Iding – Chennai Veerans – 2008 
Joost van den Bogart – Chennai Veerans – 2008

New Zealand 
Bevan Hari – Sher-e-Jalandhar – 2006

Pakistan 
Waseem Ahmad  – Hyderabad Sultans – 2005
Sohail Abbas  – Hyderabad Sultans – 2005  
Ahmed Alam – Hyderabad Sultans – 2005    
Salman Akbar  – Hyderabad Sultans – 2006   
Shakeel Abbasi  – Hyderabad Sultans – 2006–2007  
Dilawar Hussain – Chennai Veerans – 2005
Kashif Jawwad – Maratha Warriors – 2005
Mudassar Ali Khan – Bangalore Hi-fliers – 2005–2006
Zeeshan Ashraf – Chennai Veerans – 2005, Chandigarh Dynamos – 2007
Eric Raza – Maratha Warriors – 2005
Mohammad Saqlain – Maratha Warriors – 2005–2006
Muhammad Sarwar – Sher-e-Jalandhar- 2005
Rehan Butt – Bangalore Lions – 2006
Andan Zakir – Maratha Warriors – 2006, Orissa Steelers – 2007
Imran Warsi – Maratha Warriors – 2006–2007
Mohammad Shabbir – Chandigarh Dynamos – 2006
Sajjad Anwar – Chandigarh Dynamos – 2007
Muhammed Zubair – Maratha Warriors – 2007
Ehsan Ullah – Maratha Warriors – 2007 
Salman Akbar – Sher-e-Jalandhar – 2008
Dilawar Hussain – Sher-e-Jalandhar – 2008
Ghazanfar Ali – Chandigarh Dynamos -2008
Kamran Ahmed – Orissa Steelers – 2008
Adnan Maqsood – Orissa Steelers – 2008

South Korea 
Hyo Kim – Bangalore Hi-fliers – 2008
Kang Moon Kweon – Maratha Warriors – 2008

Spain 
Juan Pablo Escarre – Chennai Veerans – 2005
Pau Quemada – Sher-e-Jalandhar – 2006 
Jordi Quintana – Bangalore Lions – 2006
Ramón Alegre – Hyderabad Sultans – 2007

See also
 Premier Hockey League

References

Prem
Premier Hockey League
Premier